
Year 617 (DCXVII) was a common year starting on Saturday (link will display the full calendar) of the Julian calendar. The denomination 617 for this year has been used since the early medieval period, when the Anno Domini calendar era became the prevalent method in Europe for naming years.

Events 
 By place 

 Byzantine Empire 
 Byzantine-Sassanid War: The Persian army under Shahin Vahmanzadegan conquers Chalcedon in Anatolia, and reaches the Bosporus, threatening Constantinople. Emperor Heraclius begins peace negotiations, promising an annual tribute of 1,000 talents of gold and silver. Shahin withdraws with his army to Syria, to focus on the invasion of Egypt.
 The Avars send envoys to Constantinople for a meeting with Heraclius. He is warned about an ambush, and flees for safety behind the city walls in time. Angry at the failure to capture the Byzantine emperor, the Avars plunder Thrace and return to the Danube River, carrying off 270,000 people.

 Europe 
 Grasulf II becomes the Lombard Duke of Friuli (Italy), after the assassination of his nephews, Tasso and Kakko, in Oderzo.

 Britain  
 Sigeberht becomes king of Essex, after his father Sæward and uncle Sexred are killed in battle against the West Saxons.
 Heathens revolt in Kent under King Eadbald. During the uprising Justus, bishop of Rochester, flees to Gaul. 
 King Edwin of Northumbria invades and annexes the minor British kingdom of Elmet (approximate date).

 Asia 
 September 8 – Battle of Huoyi: Rebel forces under Li Yuān defeat the Sui troops near the Fen River, and capture the Chinese capital, Chang'an. Li has gained support from Shibi, ruler (khagan) of the Eastern Turks, who secures his northern frontier and supplies him with 2,000 horses.
 Winter –  Li Yuan demotes Sui emperor Yángdi to the status of Taishang Huang (retired emperor), and declares Yang You emperor, while he gives himself authority over the western Sui commanderies (prefecture), under the title of "Prince of Tang".

 By topic 
 Religion     
 Meccans begin a boycott of the Banu Hashim clan, to which Islamic prophet Muhammad belongs. A civil war begins in Medina.
 Battle of Bu'ath: The Arabic tribes win an indecisive battle against the Jewish tribe of Banu Qurayza, near the Medinan oasis.

Births 
 Songtsän Gampo, emperor of the Tibetan Empire (d. 649)
 Wonhyo, Korean Buddhist monk and writer (d. 686)
 Lady K’awiil Ajaw, queen regnant of the Maya city State of Cobá (d. 682)

Deaths 
 April 17 – Donnán of Eigg, Gaelic priest
 Kakko, duke of Friuli (Italy)
 Sæward, king of Essex (approximate date)
 Sexred, king of Essex (approximate date)
 Tasso, duke of Friuli (Italy)
 Wendelin of Trier, hermit and abbot (approximate date) 
 Yang Yichen, general of the Sui Dynasty
 Zhai Rang, rebel leader during the Sui Dynasty

References

Sources